Jahadabad or Jehadabad may refer to:
 Jahadabad, Ardabil
 Jahadabad, Firuzabad, Fars Province
 Jahadabad, Larestan, Fars Province
 Jahadabad, Rostam, Fars Province
 Jahadabad, Golestan
 Jahadabad, Hamadan
 Jahadabad, Ilam
 Jahadabad, Isfahan
 Jahadabad, Kerman
 Jahadabad, Jiroft, Kerman Province
 Jahadabad, Manujan, Kerman Province
 Jehadabad, Qaleh Ganj, Kerman Province
 Jahadabad, Khuzestan
 Jahadabad, Boyer-Ahmad, Kohgiluyeh and Boyer-Ahmad Province
 Jahadabad-e Cheshmeh Tagi, Boyer-Ahmad County, Kohgiluyeh and Boyer-Ahmad Province
 Jahadabad, Gachsaran, Kohgiluyeh and Boyer-Ahmad Province
 Jahadabad, Lorestan
 Jahadabad Rural District, in Kerman Province